Chalma Municipality is one of the 212 municipalities of the Mexican state of Veracruz.

Geography
It is located in the state's Huasteca Alta region. The municipal seat is the village of Chalma, Veracruz. 

The municipality of Chalma covers a total surface area of 199.05 km².

Settlements in the municipality
Chalma (municipal seat; 2005 population 2,555)
Chapopote (population 2,916)
San Pedro Coyutla (1,396)
El Pintor (925)
La Laja (360)
Aquixcuatitla (200)

Demographics
In the 2005 INEGI Census, the municipality reported a total population of 13,067, of whom 2,555 lived in the municipal seat. 
Of the municipality's inhabitants, 4,992 spoke an indigenous language, primarily Nahuatl.

References

External links 
  Municipal Official Site
  Municipal Official Information

Municipalities of Veracruz